The 2000 UBS Open Gstaad was a men's tennis tournament played on outdoor clay courts at the Roy Emerson Arena in Gstaad in Switzerland and was part of the International Series of the 2000 ATP Tour. It was the 55th edition of the tournament and ran from 10 July until 17 July 2000. First-seeded Àlex Corretja won the singles title.

Finals

Singles

 Àlex Corretja defeated  Mariano Puerta 6–1, 6–3
 It was Corretja's 2nd singles title of the year and the 11th of his career.

Doubles

 Jiří Novák /  David Rikl defeated  Jérôme Golmard /  Michael Kohlmann 3–6, 6–3, 6–4
 It was Novák's 2nd title of the year and the 11th of his career. It was Rikl's 2nd title of the year and the 17th of his career.

References

External links
 Official website 
 ATP tournament profile
 ITF tournament edition details

UBS Open Gstaad
Swiss Open (tennis)
UBS Open Gstaad
UBS Open Gstaad